Tubulointerstitial nephritis antigen-like is a protein that in humans is encoded by the TINAGL1 gene.

References

Further reading